Trusina (Cyrillic: Трусина) is a village in the municipality of Konjic, Bosnia and Herzegovina.

Demographics 
According to the 2013 census, its population was 143.

See also
 Trusina incident

References

Populated places in Konjic